Riviera is a census-designated place and unincorporated community in Kleberg County, Texas, United States. As of the 2010 census it had a population of 689.

History
Riviera was founded in 1906 by Theodore Fredrick Koch, a land promoter. He purchased land from the King Ranch to sell to landseekers. He built a townsite along the St. Louis, Brownsville and Mexico Railway and named it after the French Riviera. Koch ran a train from Chicago to Riviera twice a month to bring more people to the area. Riviera witnessed growth in its first few years, but a drought hit the area in 1915 and then a terrible hurricane hit the area in 1916. When U.S. Highway 77 was constructed, it helped the economy get back on its feet. Now its economy depends on farming.

Education
Riviera is served by Riviera Independent School District.

Grades: 7–12 Kaufer High School
Grades: PK–6 Nanny Elementary School

See also
Kingsville micropolitan area

References

External links
 
 Riviera Music Festival

Unincorporated communities in Texas
Census-designated places in Kleberg County, Texas
Kingsville, Texas micropolitan area
Census-designated places in Texas